Alpha Ursae Majoris, Latinised from α Ursae Majoris, formally named Dubhe , is, despite being designated "α" (alpha), the second-brightest object in the northern constellation of Ursa Major. This prominent asterism is known as the Big Dipper, the Plough, and the Great Bear. Alpha Ursae Majoris is the northern of the 'pointers' (or 'guards'), the second being Beta Ursae Majoris, or 'Merak' – this pair of stars point towards Polaris, the North Star.

Stellar system

α Ursae Majoris is located at a distance of approximately 123 light years from the Sun, based on parallax measurements. It is a spectroscopic binary made up of the stars designated α Ursae Majoris A and α Ursae Majoris B. The pair orbit at a separation of about 23 astronomical units (AU) with a period of 44.5 years and an eccentricity (ovalness) of 0.44. There is another spectroscopic binary at an angular separation of 7.1 arcminutes, forming a 7th magnitude pair showing an F8 spectral type with an orbital period of 6.035 days and an eccentricity of 0.09. It is sometimes referred to as Alpha Ursae Majoris C, but is separately catalogued as HD 95638. Together they form a quadruple star system.

Component A is the system's primary, and it is a giant star that has evolved away from the main sequence after consuming the hydrogen at its core. It is 280 million years old with 3.4 times the mass and has expanded 17 times the radius of the Sun. The star is radiating 165 times the luminosity of the Sun from its enlarged photosphere at an effective temperature of 5,012 K. The secondary star, component B, is a main sequence star that has a stellar classification of F0V. α Ursae Majoris has been reported to vary in brightness by about a thousandth of a magnitude. Ten radial oscillation modes have been detected, with periods between 6.4 hours and 6.4 days.

Although it is part of the constellation of Ursa Major, it is not part of the Ursa Major Moving Group of stars that have a common motion through space.

Nomenclature

α Ursae Majoris (Latinised to Alpha Ursae Majoris) is the star system's Bayer designation.

It bore the traditional name Dubhe, which is derived from the Arabic for 'bear', from the phrase   'the back of the Greater Bear'. The ancient Egyptians called it Ak, meaning 'The Eye'. In 2016, the International Astronomical Union organized a Working Group on Star Names (WGSN) to catalog and standardize proper names for stars. The WGSN's first bulletin of July 2016 included a table of the first two batches of names approved by the WGSN; which included Dubhe for the star α Ursae Majoris A.

The Hindus refer to the star as Kratu, one of the Seven Rishis.

In Chinese,  Běi Dǒu, meaning Northern Dipper, refers to an asterism equivalent to the Big Dipper. Consequently, the Chinese name for Alpha Ursae Majoris itself is  Běi Dǒu yī, and  Tiān Shū,.

In culture
Dubhe is the official star of the State of Utah.

Dubhe was a ship in the United States Navy. The Danish National Home Guard Navy ship MHV806 is also named Dubhe.

See also
Lists of stars by constellation

References

K-type giants
F-type main-sequence stars
Suspected variables
4
Double stars

Big Dipper
Ursa Major (constellation)
Ursae Majoris, Alpha
BD+62 1161
Ursae Majoris, 50
095689
054061
4301
Dubhe